Lists of newspapers, radio and television stations serving Campbellton, New Brunswick:

Newspapers
 The Tribune (English weekly; published by Brunswick News)
 La Voix du Restigouche (French weekly; published by Brunswick News)
 L'Aviron (French weekly; published by Quebecor Media)

Television
All stations are available on Rogers Cable, the local cable provider for Campbellton.

Campbellton and the surrounding area is not designated as a mandatory market for digital television conversion; only CHAU-TV, CFTF-DT and Télé-Québec announced their intentions to convert all their transmitters to digital, regardless of location.  Since the digital conversion, CBC Television (via CBAT-DT) and Radio-Canada (via CBAFT-DT) have only been available on cable.

All stations are analog unless specified otherwise.

CHNB-DT, CJBR-DT, CBMT-DT and CTV Two Atlantic have also been available on cable for decades.

Radio

 
Campbellton
Media, Campbellton